Chile competed at the 2006 Winter Olympics in Turin, Italy.

Alpine skiing

7 of Chile's 9 athletes in Turin participated in alpine skiing, including the country's top finisher, Noelle Barahona, who was 30th in the women's combined. The 15-year-old was more than 35 seconds behind the gold medal winner, and more than 20 behind the next-to-last finisher, but did complete all three runs, something 15 other competitors were unable to do.

Note: In the men's combined, run 1 is the downhill, and runs 2 and 3 are the slalom. In the women's combined, run 1 and 2 are the slalom, and run 3 the downhill.

Biathlon

Zúñiga finished second-to-last in both his events, while Isbej was last in each of hers.

References

External links
 Chile NOC
 

Nations at the 2006 Winter Olympics
2006 Winter Olympics
Winter Olympics